Hugershoff Cove is a cove lying less than  south of Louise Island and Emma Island, and  northwest of Beaupré Cove in Wilhelmina Bay, along the west coast of Graham Land, Antarctica. It was charted by the Belgian Antarctic Expedition under Gerlache, 1897–99, and was named by the UK Antarctic Place-Names Committee in 1960 for Carl R. Hugershoff (1882–1941), a German geodesist who designed the autocartograph, an instrument which first applied the principles of photogrammetry to air photos, in about 1921.

References

Coves of Graham Land
Danco Coast